Libai Huang is a Chinese-American chemist who is a professor at Purdue University. She is interested in unravelling the structure-property relationships of next-generation solar materials.

Early life and education 
Huang earned a doctorate BS from Peking University in 2001 and a PhD from University of Rochester in 2006. Her doctorate developed ultrafast nonlinear optical spectroscopy of single-wall carbon nanotubes. Huang then joined Argonne National Laboratory as a postdoctoral fellow.

Research and career 
Huang joined the faculty at Purdue University. In 2011, she was a Kavli Foundation Fellow. Her research considers the development of ultrafast, spatially resolved spectroscopies to understand charge transport in the active layers of solar cells. She has developed ultrafast spectroscopic probes that can be combined with optical microscopes to achieve nm-resolution high frequency temporal information, so-called ultrafast nanoscopy. When it comes to imaging the active layers of solar cells, Huang has studied exciton formation and charge transport at femtosecond timescales. She tracked the hot carriers that form in perovskite solar cells, and showed that they can travel hundreds of nanometers (lasting around 100 picoseconds) before decaying as heat. In singlet fission materials, Huang identified singlet-mediate triplet transport mechanisms, which can cause long-range triplet diffusion. She makes use of optical pump-probe techniques to understand two-dimensional materials.

In 2021, Huang joined a United States Department of Energy effort to develop new materials for quantum technology.

Selected publications

References

External links 

Living people
Peking University alumni
University of Rochester alumni
Purdue University faculty
American chemists
American women scientists
Chinese emigrants to the United States
Year of birth missing (living people)